Amosa Gbadamosi (born 15 April 1942) is a Ghanaian former footballer. He competed in the men's tournament at the 1968 Summer Olympics.

References

External links
 
 

1942 births
Living people
Ghanaian footballers
Ghana international footballers
Olympic footballers of Ghana
Footballers at the 1968 Summer Olympics
Association football midfielders
People from Tamale, Ghana
Accra Hearts of Oak S.C. players